The Mineu is a left tributary of the river Sălaj in Romania. It flows into the Sălaj in Sălățig.

References

Rivers of Romania
Rivers of Sălaj County